The Beatles 1964 world tour was the Beatles' first world tour, launched after their 1964 UK tour. The reception was enthusiastic, with The Spectator describing it as "hysterical". It was followed by their subsequent North American tour in August that year.

Tour history

The Jimmy Nicol replacement
On the morning of June 3, 1964, the day before setting off on a world tour, Ringo Starr fell ill during a photo session. He fainted and was taken to hospital with a strong fever: he was diagnosed with severe tonsillitis, and hospitalized for a few days in London.

The Beatles, especially George Harrison, wanted to postpone the tour, but then the manager Brian Epstein and the producer George Martin after a frantic phone call decided to use a session man to temporarily replace Ringo.

When the Beatles asked him during rehearsals how he was doing, his answer was always "It's getting better". The phrase was later used in "Getting Better", a song from the 1967 album Sgt. Pepper's Lonely Hearts Club Band. Years later he confessed that he would have done it for free, but Epstein offered him £2,500 per performance and a £2,500 bonus. "I couldn't sleep that night, I was one of the fucking Beatles!" he said in a 1988 interview.

The next day, June 4, 1964, there was a show in Copenhagen, Denmark and with the Beatles he did more shows, until Starr, recovered, joined the group in Melbourne, Australia, on June 14.

Nicol, with a very shy character, was unable to say goodbye to the group and left at night while they were sleeping. At the airport, Brian Epstein handed him £500 and a gold watch with the inscription "From The Beatles and Brian Epstein to Jimmy - with appreciation and gratitude". On the return journey on the plane he was very sad, he felt "like a bastard child rejected by his new family".

Tour dates

Typical set list
The typical set list for the shows was as follows (with lead singers noted):

"I Saw Her Standing There" (Paul McCartney)
"I Want To Hold Your Hand" (John Lennon) and (Paul McCartney) or You Can't Do That" (John Lennon)
"All My Loving" (Paul McCartney)
"She Loves You" (John Lennon, Paul McCartney and (George Harrison)
"Till There Was You" (Paul McCartney)
"Roll Over Beethoven" (George Harrison)
"Can't Buy Me Love" (Paul McCartney)
"This Boy" (John Lennon, Paul McCartney and George Harrison)
"Twist and Shout" (John Lennon)
"Long Tall Sally" (Paul McCartney)

See also
 List of the Beatles' live performances

Notes

External links
The Beatles tour New Zealand.

References

The Spectator, Volume 213, 1964

1964 concert tours
1964 World
Concert tours of Australia
Concert tours of New Zealand
June 1964 events
July 1964 events
August 1964 events